Hungarian-Kazakhstan relations (Hungarian: Magyar-kazaksztán kapcsolatok) are foreign relations between Hungary and Kazakhstan. Hungary has an embassy in Astana and four honorary consulates (in Atirau, Aktobe, Simkent, and Almaty). Kazakhstan has an embassy in Budapest. Diplomatic relations between the countries were established on 2 April 1992. Due to the shared historical, cultural, and linguistic traits, the country became one of the most important socio-economic partners of Hungary.

History 
Hungary recognized the independence of Kazakhstan in 1992.

Kazakhstan opened its first consulate in Karcag in 1998 February. The town is important because it is the center of the region where most descendants of Kuns live, an ethnic group with the closest ties to the Kazakh Kipchaks. The consulate promotes the interest of Kazakhstan, provides administrative services to Kazakh citizens, and cooperates with both the Kazakh embassy and the town of Karcag.

High-level visits 

 February 2015 - Foreign Minister Péter Szijjártó  met with Prime Minister Karim Maszimov
 March–April 2015 - Prime Minister Viktor Orbán visited Kazakhstan along with several high-ranking ministers and government officials and met with President Nursultan Nazarbayev, and Prime Minister Karim Maszimov
 October 2015 - Ambassador of Hungary to Kazakhstan András Baranyi handed over his letter of credence to President Nursultan Nazarbayev
 April 2016 - Zsolt Csutora, Deputy Assistant Secretary of State responsible for the Eastern opening visited Astana
 October 2016 - Minister of Finance Mihály Varga along with a large official delegation and 30 representatives of Hungarian companies visited a business forum in Astana

Bilateral agreements 
Hungarian citizens can enter Kazakhstan without a visa for trips not exceeding 30 days since 2017.

See also 

 Foreign relations of Hungary
 Foreign relations of Kazakhstan
 List of diplomatic missions of Hungary
 List of diplomatic missions in Hungary

References 

 
Kazakhstan
Bilateral relations of Kazakhstan